Cambuslang West is one of the 20 electoral wards of South Lanarkshire Council. Created in 2007, the ward elects three councillors using the single transferable vote electoral system and covers an area with a population of 14,096 people.

The ward has politically been split between Labour, the Liberal Democrats and the Scottish National Party (SNP) with each party returning one councillor at half of the elections.

Boundaries
The ward was created following the Fourth Statutory Reviews of Electoral Arrangements ahead of the 2007 Scottish local elections. As a result of the Local Governance (Scotland) Act 2004, local elections in Scotland would use the single transferable vote electoral system from 2007 onwards so Cambuslang West was formed from an amalgamation of several previous first-past-the-post wards. It contained part of the former Cairns ward, roughly half of the former Cathkin/Springhall and Cambuslang Central wards as well as all of the former Eastfield and Kirkhill/Whitlawburn wards. As a result of amendments to the boundaries of the South Lanarkshire Council's management areas, the boundaries between Rutherglen and Cambuslang, East Kilbride and Hamilton were tweaked so Cambuslang West also contained part of the former Long Calderwood ward. Cambuslang West covers a suburban area in the west of Cambuslang including the town centre and the neighbourhoods of Eastfield, Greenlees, Kirkhill, Silverbank and Whitlawburn. The ward's northern boundary is the division with Glasgow City Council which runs along the River Clyde.

Prior to the local government reforms in the 1990s, Cambuslang was within the Glasgow District under Strathclyde Regional Council. One of its single-member wards was Cambuslang which included much of the same area as the current Cambuslang West.

Following the Fifth Statutory Reviews of Electoral Arrangements ahead of the 2017 Scottish local elections, streets around East Kilbride Road, Brownside Road and Dukes Road were transferred from the ward into Rutherglen South while streets between Greenlees Road and the Cathcart Circle Line railway tracks over Hamilton Road were transferred into Cambuslang West from Cambuslang East.

Councillors

Election results

2022 election

2017 election

2012 election

2007 election

Notes

References

Wards of South Lanarkshire
Cambuslang